Palo Verde (Spanish for "Green Stick"; Mojave: Hanyomalivah) is a census-designated place (CDP) in Imperial County, California.  Its name comes from the native desert tree, Palo Verde (Parkinsonia florida), which in turn takes its name from the Spanish for stick (palo) and green (verde), sharing its name with the Palo Verde Valley, the valley it is located.

The Imperial County line passes just north of the town. A community named Ripley, in Riverside County lies along SR78 between Blythe and Palo Verde.

The ZIP Code for the community is 92266 and there is no postal delivery; residents use post office boxes. There is a U.S. Postal Service post office and an Imperial County Sheriff's substation. The first post office to operate at Palo Verde opened in 1903 as Paloverde, changed its name to Palo Verde in 1905, and closed in 1940. A post office was re-established in 1949.

Geography
It is part of the 'El Centro, California Metropolitan Statistical Area'. State Route 78 (Ben Hulse Highway) runs north-south through the community. The majority of its population lives east of SR78 and west of the nearby Colorado River. It is also in the southern portion of the Palo Verde Valley.

Climate

Demographics

2010
The 2010 United States Census reported that Palo Verde had a population of 171. The racial makeup of Palo Verde was 124 (73%) White, 2 (1%) African American, 5 (3%) Native American, 1 (1%) Asian, 0 (0%) Pacific Islander, 26 (15%) from other races, and 13 (8%) from two or more races. Hispanic or Latino of any race were 33 persons (19%).

The Census reported that 171 people (100% of the population) lived in households, 0 (0%) lived in non-institutionalized group quarters, and 0 (0%) were institutionalized.

There were 84 households, out of which 11 (13%) had children under the age of 18 living in them, 28 (33%) were opposite-sex married couples living together, 4 (5%) had a female householder with no husband present, 7 (8%) had a male householder with no wife present. There were 7 (8%) unmarried opposite-sex partnerships, and 0 (0%) same-sex married couples or partnerships. 40 households (48%) were made up of individuals, and 17 (20%) had someone living alone who was 65 years of age or older. The average household size was 2.04. There were 39 families (46% of all households); the average family size was 2.90.

The population was spread out, with 25 people (15%) under the age of 18, 15 people (9%) aged 18 to 24, 23 people (14%) aged 25 to 44, 65 people (38.0%) aged 45 to 64, and 43 people (25%) who were 65 years of age or older. The median age was 54.5 years. For every 100 females, there were 119.2 males. For every 100 females age 18 and over, there were 121.2 males.

The homeowner vacancy rate was 17%; the rental vacancy rate was 17%. 63 people (37% of the population) lived in owner-occupied housing units and 108 people (63%) lived in rental housing units.

2000
As of the census of 2000, there were 236 people, 130 households, and 60 families residing in the CDP. The racial makeup of the CDP was 79% White, 1% Black or African American, 15% from other races, and 6% from two or more races. 19% of the population were Hispanic or Latino of any race.

There were 130 households, out of which 17% had children under the age of 18 living with them, 35% were married couples living together, 6% had a female householder with no husband present, and 54% were non-families. 50% of all households were made up of individuals, and 33% had someone living alone who was 65 years of age or older. The average household size was 1.82 and the average family size was 2.63.

In the CDP, the population was spread out, with 17% under the age of 18, 1% from 18 to 24, 20% from 25 to 44, 29% from 45 to 64, and 32% who were 65 years of age or older. The median age was 55 years. For every 100 females, there were 110.7 males. For every 100 females age 18 and over, there were 104.2 males.

The median income for a household in the CDP was $12,772, and the median income for a family was $14,333. Males had a median income of $13,281 versus $9,792 for females. The per capita income for the CDP was $7,275. About 45% of families and 47% of the population were below the poverty line, including 71% of those under the age of eighteen and 13% of those 65 or over.

Politics and Government

Palo Verde receives water from the Palo Verde County Water District.

See also
 San Diego–Imperial, California
 El Centro Metropolitan Area
 Blythe, California

References

Census-designated places in Imperial County, California
Populated places in the Colorado Desert
Communities in the Lower Colorado River Valley
Populated places in the Sonoran Desert
Census-designated places in California